
Gmina Krzymów is a rural gmina (administrative district) in Konin County, Greater Poland Voivodeship, in west-central Poland.

Villages
Gmina Krzymów contains the villages and settlements of Adamów, Borowo, Brzezińskie Holendry, Brzeźno, Chójki, Drążeń, Drążno-Holendry, Genowefa, Głodno, Ignacew, Kałek, Krzymów, Nowe Paprockie Holendry, Nowy Krzymów, Paprotnia, Piersk, Potażniki, Rożek Brzeziński, Smolnik, Stare Paprockie Holendry, Szczepidło, Teresina and Zalesie.

Neighbouring gminas
Gmina Krzymów is bordered by the city of Konin and by the gminas of Kościelec, Kramsk, Stare Miasto, Tuliszków and Władysławów.

References
Polish official population figures 2006

Krzymow
Konin County